Jumpei Hokazono (外薗 潤平, Hokazono Junpei, born 20 March 1991) is a Japanese sailor. He competed in the men's 470 event at the 2020 Summer Olympics.

References

External links
 
 

1991 births
Living people
Japanese male sailors (sport)
Olympic sailors of Japan
Sailors at the 2020 Summer Olympics – 470
Sportspeople from Kagoshima Prefecture